Ture Junttu (28 April 1911 − 24 September 1981) was a Finnish actor and director. He appeared in films between 1938 and 1979.

Selected filmography 

Nainen on valttia (1944)
Linnaisten vihreä kamari (1945)
Kohtalo johtaa meitä (1945)
Sadan miekan mies (1951)
Poika eli kesäänsä (1955)
Ei ruumiita makuuhuoneeseen (1959)
Akseli and Elina (1970)
Pohjantähti (1973)

References

External links 
 

1911 births
1981 deaths
People from Pirkkala
People from Häme Province (Grand Duchy of Finland)
Finnish male film actors
20th-century Finnish male actors